Un autre monde (Another World) is the fifth and final album by French rock band Téléphone, released on 7 May 1984 by EMI France. The album features John Entwistle (of English rock band The Who) playing the horn.

Track listing

Personnel

Téléphone 
 Jean-Louis Aubert – lead vocals, rhythm guitar, piano
Louis Bertignac – lead guitar, backing vocals, lead vocals on "66 heures", "Le garçon d'ascenseur", and "Oublie ça"
Corine Marienneau – bass guitar, backing vocals
Richard Kolinka – percussion, backing vocals

Additional Musicians
 John Entwistle – horn on "T'as qu'ces mots"
Wix Wickens – accordion and synthesizer on "T'as qu'ces mots"

Production 

 Glyn Johns – production
 François Ravard – management

Design 

 François Sévemon – cover art
 Lynn Goldsmith – photography
 Penny Smith – photography
 Jean-Baptiste Mondino – photography

References

Téléphone albums
1984 albums
Albums produced by Glyn Johns